Leprocaulon is a genus of lichen-forming fungi in the family Leprocaulaceae. Members of the genus Leprocaulon are commonly called mealy lichens.

Species
Leprocaulon adhaerens 
Leprocaulon americanum 
Leprocaulon beechingii  – eastern North America
Leprocaulon calcicola  – Great Britain
Leprocaulon coriense 
Leprocaulon knudsenii  – mountain ranges of central and southern California, USA
Leprocaulon nicholsiae 
Leprocaulon santamonicae 
Leprocaulon terricola 
Leprocaulon textum

References

Lecanoromycetes
Lecanoromycetes genera
Lichen genera
Taxa named by William Nylander (botanist)
Taxa described in 1879